Linda Nicholas (born Linda Hoile, 13 April 1946), known by her stage name Linda Hoyle, is a singer, songwriter and art therapist. She is best known for her work with the band Affinity (1968–1971), as well as for her collaboration with Karl Jenkins on her album Pieces of Me, produced in 1971.  Hoyle's latest album, The Fetch, produced by Mo Foster, was released by Angel Air on 7 August 2015. In 2018, she was co-lyricist on a chamber opera, Look! An Opera in 9 Paintings – about a couple on an awkward date at an art gallery – which debuted on June 3, 2018 to sold-out performances at Museum London, Canada.

Early life and influences 
Linda was born and grew up in Hammersmith, London.  Her mother, Marjorie ("Madge", née Penfold), was a shorthand typist, working with the Kensington and Chelsea Police Force and CID.  Her father, Gordon ("Dick") was an accountant with Sun Life Insurance.

For the first decade of Linda's life, the family lived in a small ground-floor flat with few amenities.  Nevertheless, on a Saturday, Dick would buy a new 78 rpm jazz record which was played for the family to dance to. This music consisted mostly of Fats Waller, Louis Armstrong, Mezz Mezzrow and others, with an historic backlog of Bessie Smith, Bix Beiderbecke, Mugsy Spanier and Fletcher Henderson. Oddities from 1920s and 30s jazz were the backbone of Linda's musical experience, stirred into Madge's attempts to introduce classical music – Vaughan Williams, Tchaikovsky, Elgar.

Her early education was at St Peter's, a Church school, then Chiswick County School for Girls.  She was told in no uncertain terms by her music teacher, Miss Cooper, that she showed no ability.  However, she happily sang Everly Brothers songs, in harmony with friends, in the echoing school toilets.

Wendy Hoile, Linda's younger sister, was able to sing in harmony from a very young age.  She played guitar and sang in a band, Blanch Carter and the Lounge Lizards, in the late 1960s and early 70s. Both Linda and her sister learnt first to play the ukulele and then the guitar.  They performed together often at family gatherings and parties, sometimes using the family convector heater, a Valor, as a primitive piece of echo and reverb equipment, singing into it even when it was lit.
 
Linda's main vocal influence, Billie Holiday, was introduced to her at 16 by a family friend who played her "Strange Fruit".  She went immediately and spent her savings on Volume One of the CBS compilation The Billie Holiday Story, learning all the vocals note for note. After hearing Ella Fitzgerald's recording of "ICan't Face the Music" she began to include more modern improvisation influences: Sara Vaughan, Anita O'Day, Frank Sinatra and later Betty Carter, Cleo Laine, Karen Dalton, Laura Nyro and others.

After finishing at Chiswick County, Linda worked for a year at Hammersmith Hospital as a trainee Laboratory Technician, followed by a three-year teacher training course at Wall Hall College of Education, Hertfordshire.

Musical career

Through a boyfriend who was a student at Sussex University, Hoyle met the University of Sussex's US Jazz Trio – Lynton Naiff (keyboards), Foster (drums) and Nick Nicholas (double bass) – who asked her to sing with them at a nightclub on the Sussex coast. It was during this time that a flurry of interchangeable jazz-rock bands were playing at Sussex, culminating in a decision by Naiff, Foster and Grant Serpell to pursue playing professionally. Naiff, at the time enrolled to do a MSc in Mathematics, dropped out of his course after a few months, renting a bungalow on the South Downs to organise the band.  Mike Jopp was recruited as lead guitarist, and after considering male singers it was decided to take the risk of having a female front the band.  Although in a previous incarnation the band had been known as "Ice", the name Affinity was chosen. Naiff, particularly, was a huge fan of Oscar Peterson, after whose 1961 album the name was chosen.

The shift of Linda's name from Hoile to Hoyle occurred early in her singing career. Journalists and interviewers invariably spelt it incorrectly as Hoyle, a much more common spelling.

The band quickly found work and their first live performance was in London at the Revolution on Bruton Street in 1968, which was managed by an insomniac businessman, Jim Carter-Fea, who also owned the Speakeasy and the Pheasantry in Chelsea.  The Revolution was, in the late 1960s, a hot spot for celebrities.  Affinity, over its many engagements there, had in their audience at various times Judy Garland, John Lennon and Stevie Wonder, the latter taking to the stage to play harmonica with the band.

Foster, in many ways the most enterprising member, introduced the band to Ronnie Scott's management, who at the time were looking for new bands to play Upstairs at their renovated club. Almost immediately signed, they spent three years under contract, starting early in 1969. By the middle of that year, Scott's decided that Affinity should also play Downstairs, opposite such jazz musicians as Les McCann and Stan Getz. This encouraged them to become more demanding of their own musical creativity. At the time of Affinity's appearance opposite McCann in July 1969, Hoyle was interviewed by Melody Maker and spoke about her musical influences and her time with the band.

During this time Affinity were managed by Chips Chipperfield, who later produced The Beatles Anthology, a documentary series for television.

Naiff's father, himself a musician, owned a music shop and business in Soho. The band initially used his own brand of amplifiers and speakers, called 'Impact'. However, the quality was poor and Hoyle, pressing hard for vocal volume during live performances, damaged her vocal cords. Surgery became necessary to remove nodes, and she was unable to sing for some months. She decided to seek vocal training from a professional singing teacher.

The album Affinity was released in 1970. Affinity's contract with Vertigo, a branch of Philips Records, included an advance payment, which allowed them to buy new equipment and a more comfortable six-wheel vehicle, and to employ a roadie. The band were busy with TV appearances, and touring in the UK and Europe; even so they were finding it hard to live on their earnings. In her interview with Jackie magazine in December 1970, Hoyle talked about the upsides and downsides of life on the road.

The same year Hoyle recorded the jingle for a Shredded Wheat television commercial "There are two men in my life" with Foster and Mike Jopp, both playing acoustic guitars.  The commercial achieved much attention in the UK and Hoyle performed the song on the Michael Parkinson Show.

Annie Nightingale, a pioneering BBC presenter, travelled with the band in January 1971, making a film about their life on the road for TV. However, at this time Hoyle's three-year relationship with Naiff was coming to an end and she was ready to quit the band.

In 1971 Ronnie Scott suggested that Hoyle work with Karl Jenkins on a solo album.  They wrote many of the songs together and Jenkins invited Chris Spedding, John Marshall, and Jeff Clyne, all from Nucleus, among others to play on the album.  Only 300 copies of the album, Pieces of Me, were pressed. It is one of Vertigo's rarest albums.

Hoyle emigrated to Canada in 1972, where she continued to sing, mostly jazz, with various musicians. During a sabbatical year in England in 1980, Hoyle performed and sang with the People Show. People Show No 84 (The Bridge), was staged at the Royal Court Theatre, London and the Crucible, Sheffield. Since 1984, Hoyle has sung and worked with Oliver Whitehead.
Hoyle's return to writing and recording was sparked by an Affinity reunion at a private party in 2006. After performing again with Foster at Sussex University's 50th anniversary celebration in 2011 (this performance released as The Baskervilles Reunion 2011), work on The Fetch began. The songs on this album are all original, composed by Foster or Whitehead, with lyrics by Hoyle. The musicians include Ray Russell, Gary Husband, B. J. Cole, Peter Van Hooke and Julian Littman.

Art therapy 
Hoyle received an Honours BA in Psychology in 1975, and a Master's degree in Biomedical Ethics in 1982, both from the University of Western Ontario.  She worked as a therapist in various agencies, and trained in Art Therapy with Irene Dewdney (1914–1999).  They remained colleagues and co-workers for the rest of Dewdney's life.  With Dewdney and others, she started The Ontario Art Therapy Association in 1979.  In 1988 Hoyle was invited to establish the Post Graduate Diploma in Art Therapy at the University of Western Ontario, running the programme and teaching.  She co-authored, with Dewdney an art therapy textbook, Drawing Out The Self: The Objective Approach in Art Therapy, which was published in 2011, together with an accompanying Web site.

Personal life 
In 1972 Hoyle married John "Nick" Nicholas, the original bass player with the University of Sussex Jazz Trio. Nicholas is a historian of philosophy and science. Their daughter, Emily, was born in 1982.

Discography

Albums 
 Affinity (1970) (Vertigo 6360 004) – by Affinity
 Pieces of Me (1971) (Vertigo 6360 060) – solo album
 The Baskervilles Reunion 2011 (Angel Air 2012) – with Mo Foster, Grant Serpell, Ray Russell, Glyn James, John Carter, Mike Jopp, Gary Husband, Andy Brentnall and Brian Davis
 The Fetch (Angel Air 2015) – solo album

Album re-issues 
 Affinity was re-issued in 2006 under the name Affinity Mark-2: Linda Hoyle Years as part of a 5-CD limited collectors edition by the Japanese AMR "Archive" label

Compilations and remixes 
 "Lonely Women" from Pieces of Me was reproduced on Sassafras & Moonshine: The Songs of Laura Nyro (2012)
 "Morning for One" from Pieces of Me, "Three Sisters" and "I Am and So Are You" from Affinity, were used by Andy Votel in his remix album Vertigo Mixed

Singles 
 "I Wonder If I Care As Much" / "Three Sisters" (1970) (Vertigo 6059 007) – by Affinity
  "Eli's Coming" / "United States of Mind" (1970) (Vertigo 6059 018) − by Affinity

Television appearances 
 1970 onwards – The UK Shredded Wheat commercial "There are two men in my life"
 1970, 21 June – Disco 2 with Affinity
 1971 – Annie Nightingale's programme about Affinity
 1971 – Sez Les (Series 3)
 1971 – Michael Parkinson Show
 1972, 2 May – The Old Grey Whistle Test (singing "Marty Mole", "Black Crow" and "Paper Tulips")

References

External links
 
 

English women singers
Canadian women singers
English songwriters
Canadian songwriters
Vertigo Records artists
Living people
1946 births
Affinity (band) members